MTV Roadies Xtreme is the fifteenth season of Indian reality show MTV Roadies. The show is hosted by Rannvijay Singha. It started airing on MTV India from 18 February 2018. The audition was done by the four aspiring gang leaders - Raftaar, Nikhil Chinapa, Neha Dhupia and Prince Narula and from this season, Rannvijay Singha serves as a mentor and host.

Roadies' selection (episodes- 1 to 7) 
This season the auditions were different from past seasons, the contestants had to get a least of 3 votes from the gang leaders and as a twist Rannvijay had a special power and had 2 votes.

 Indicates the contestant is male.
 Indicates the contestant is female.

Culling process (episode- 8) 

 Direct Entries: Shruti Sinha, Vidit Sharma and Priya Sindhu.

Total count:
Male  contestants = 10
Female  contestants = 10

Battleground (episode- 8) 
It is an online selection process in which participants are given various tasks to perform in order to get shortlisted. Four contestants, namely Mazer and N/A, Iram and Nikav were shortlisted. Iram and Nikav won the Final Battleground challenge and entered in Episode-18.

Roadies distribution (Shillong journey) (episodes- 9 to 14) 
 1st Task: Reck & Roll For this task, gang leaders had to select 2 male roadies each. 1 of the roadies had to break a set of materials into small pieces and the other roadie was tied hanging on top. The tied roadie had to free himself and put as many pieces into a jar, the pair with more number of pieces will win. The winners will then get to choose in which gang they want to be in.

 Neha vs Prince: None of them was able to finish the task.
 Nikhil vs Raftaar: Team Nikhil won.
Rohan chose Nikhil's Gang and Kashish chose Prince's Gang.

 2nd Task: ID Shoes Lag Gai For this task, gang leaders had to select 1 male roadie each whom they don't want to be in other gang leader's gang. The 4 roadies will compete to earn immunity from the 1st Vote-out. The task was divided in 3 rounds. 
Round 1: The roadies have to pull a log of wood tied with a rope along a pulley and drop it on a box to break it and get the flag in it. The first 3 roadies to get the flag move to the next round. 
Round 2: The 3 roadies have to wrestle in a circle marked on the ground to push a contestant out of the circle. The remaining 2 roadies move to the last round. 
Round 3: The roadies have to climb a ladder and reach the top to place their flag. One of their leg is tied to a metal weight covered by wooden planks. The roadies have to pull the weight up breaking the planks and reaching the top. The one who will reach first, will win the task. 

 Sonu and abhishek was eliminated in 1st Round and was directly in the danger in the 1st Vote-out.
 Pavneet was eliminated in 2nd Round and was in the danger in the 1st Vote-out.
 Vidit was eliminated in 3rd Round and was in the  danger in the 1st Vote-out.
Bibek won the task and won immunity.

3rd Task: Ice Ice Baby
For this task, gang leaders had to select 1 female contestant as their first choice, the selected girl had to select her best friend for this task.
All four girls had to put her hand inside ice to raise flag and see the sequence of artifacts which she had to arrange in perfect order. If she fails, she had to convince other performers to join to raise the flag again but the sequence will be changed. After completing her friend should do the same. The winner who is the first choice will get the advantage.

 Shruti and Minnie won the task.
 Shruti chose Nikhil's gang which gave him the two powers.

i) He had to put Shruti's partner Minnie in one of the other three gangs. Minnie joined Prince's gang.

ii) He had to put any one female roadie each in the other two gangs. Nikhil put Farah in Raftaar's gang and Surbhi in Neha's gang.

Bibek Bora quit the show

 4th Task: Daawat-e-Darts For this task, gang leaders had to select 1 female roadie each whom they don't want to be in other gang leader's gang. The 4 roadies will compete to earn immunity from the 2nd Vote-out. The four girls had to sit on a platform and throw darts at the four poles or the board having the names of all the other roadies along with the gang leaders behind the poles. If the dart hit the pole, the girl would herself perform the task. If the dart hit a name on the board, the girl should convince that roadie or gang leader to perform for her. The contestant performing had to spin the wheel having the names of four local delicacies and had to eat that dish on which the arrow landed. When a contestant ate the dish, the concerned girl got one point. The girl who will get 5 points will win the task. 

Preeti won the task and won immunity.

Samiksha got 0 points.

Priya, Samiksha and Geetika were in the danger.

Episode 12 
Special Vote Out

1. The gang leaders had to write the name of the roadie in the danger zone whom they wanted to eliminate.

2. The roadies had to write the name of the roadie whom they wanted to eliminate, along with the name of the gang leader whom they think must have written that name.

3. If their vote matched with the gang leader whose name has been written, only then the vote will be counted.

1. No Gang Leader Voted for Geetika, so her 2 votes were cancelled.

2. 5 roadies voted for Priya with Gang Leader name Nikhil and 3 roadies voted for Priya with Gang Leader Neha.

3. 6 roadies voted for Samiksha with Gang Leader name Prince and 2 roadies voted for Samiksha with Gang Leader Raftaar.

Samiksha Malik got voted out with 8 votes.

5th Task:Rang Dheela 
For this task the gang leaders had to decide who would go against whom, but the competition would be between all 4 of them. Raftaar went against Prince and Neha against Nikhil.
One gang leader had to decide which roadies (one girl and one boy) would play for the gang leader going against him and vice versa.

The task has 3 phases. Each phase is to be performed by either of the two roadies and the gang leader.

Phase 1: The first member has to climb up a structure and pull out bamboos having colored bricks, which will fall down when the bamboo is pulled out.

Phase 2: The second member has to duel the second member of the opposite team to pick up the brick and give it to the third member.

Phase 3: The third member has to balance the bricks in the order of colors VIBGYOR on a platform that has to be balanced by a rope.

The team who balances the entire correct sequence for five seconds will win the task and that gang leader will get the power.

Team Nikhil won the task and Nikhil got the power to choose any one male and any one female roadie to join his gang.

Nishkarsh and Shubhada joined Gang  Nikhil.

Wild Card - Sharan Vs Mehakdeep

The roadies had to choose between Sharan and Mehakdeep to 'vote in' for the journey.

Mehakdeep entered into the competition by getting majority of votes.

Sixth task

Nikhil was given a choice to replace wild card roadie Mahekdeep with anyone in his gang. Mehakdeep joined Nikhil's gang after Nikhil chose to remove Nishkarsh.

For this task remaining 4 girls who were not in any gang were paired up with one male roadie each by the gang leaders.

The girl has to describe traditional ornaments from a picture of a couple. Each ornament is allotted a number which their partner has to check from Oppo phone. Then the partner has to ride a cart up to the numbers and pick up the ornament of that number, giving it to the girl. The girl finally has to dress those correct ornaments on a local couple.

1. The pair with maximum number of correct ornaments will get to choose which gang they want to join together.

2. The pair who came second will choose one gang leader who will decide that into which gang that pair should go.

3. The remaining two pairs will go directly into the danger zone.

Khursheed and Preeti chose Prince's Gang.

Sonu and Geetika chose Prince to decide that into which gang that pair should go and Prince decided Raftaar's Gang.

Vote out 3 (last vote out of Shillong)

Nishkarsh, Priya, Abhishek and Kriti were in danger zone. Roadies had to vote out one boy and one girl.

Priya Sindhu and Abhishek Dubey were eliminated with majority votes.

Kriti, Nishkarsh and Sandy joined Neha's Gang. Vidit joined Raftaar's Gang.

Finalists
•Gang Neha:-
Kashish Thakur Pundir-Winner

•Gang Prince:-
1. Preeti Kuntal-1st Runner-up
2. Niskarsh arora-2nd Runner-up

Gangs

 Gangs after auction: (episode 22)

Gangs vs Gangs (Kaziranga journey) (episodes- 14 to 18) 

 Seventh task: Bihu-bali For this task, gangs and gang leaders had to create an entertainment performance with the Bihu Dance.
The winning gang will become immune from the next vote-out.Judges: Rannvijay Singh and Gaelyn Mendonca
 The Gang Leaders had a power to disqualify one Gang from this Task.
 Gang Neha, Nikhil and Prince voted Raftaar and Raftaar voted Nikhil. As a 3-1 vote, Gang Raftaar was disqualified from the task results.
 Gang Raftaar were in 1st Place in the Task but due to disqualification, they didn't win Immunity.
 Gang Prince were 2nd Place, Gang Nikhil were in 3rd and Gang Neha were in 4th.
 Gang Prince won task and immunity.

Eighth task: Ande ka Funda

For this task, Gang Raftaar competed against Gang Nikhil and Gang Neha combined for 3 immunities because of Gang Raftaar being targeted in the 7th task.

So 2 members from Gang Raftaar would compete against one member each from the other two gangs.

The task had 3 phases.

1. One member has to dig eggs buried in a landmine and throw them to the second member through a net. After ten minutes, their positions will be interchanged.

2. One member has to throw those collected eggs to his partner. Any member from the opposite team has to stand in the middle of them with a bamboo in the hand and break the eggs before they reached the second member.

3. The team member has to throw the collected eggs to his gang leader who has to put one egg each in an inverted pot and break the pot without cracking the egg.

The team with more number of uncracked, perfect eggs will win the immunity.

Team Nikhil and Neha collected one egg but because Nikhil cracked the egg while breaking the pot, they lost the immunity.

Gang Raftaar couldn't collect a single egg and they lost immunity as well.

Fara Fatima Khan got voted out with 9 votes.

9th Task: Jaalbaaz

For this task the gang leaders had to choose one strongest and one weakest member respectively.

Two gangs had to form an alliance. In each alliance the strongest member of one gang will perform the task with the weakest member of the other gang.

Prince and Nikhil formed one alliance. Neha and Raftaar formed the other alliance

The task had 2 phases.

Phase 1 : Both the contestants have to enter the grid from opposite directions and reach the central disc. According to the instructions given by their gang leaders with the help of Oppo phone, they have to construct a tower over the central disc.

Phase 2 : One contestant then has to move around the grid and collect 5 flags without disturbing the wires, which on slight touch can make the tower collapse.

 The team completing the task in the least time will win. 
Amongst the two winners, the member who has been selected as the strongest, will have immunity along with the other two members of his/her gang (except the weakest member of the gang)

 The other winning member who has been selected will have immunity alone.
 Team Mehakdeep and Minnie won the challenge.

Hence, 3 members of Gang Nikhil and Minnie from Gang Prince won immunity.

 Mehakdeep, Rohan, Shubhada and Minni won immunity.
Tenth task: Dung Charades

For this task the gang leaders had to participate along with their gang members. The task had 3 stages.

Stage 1:
The remaining members excluding one member each at stage 2 and stage 3 has to perform at this stage.

The contestants have to enter a pit filled with rhinoceros poop and dig out tokens with their mouth and legs, with their hands tied at the back.

Once a team collects 10 tokens, they can move to the second stage.

Stage 2:
The contestant has to decipher a Bollywood movie name from emoticons and act it out to the team member at stage 3.

Stage 3:
The contestant has to guess the Bollywood movies.

The team which guesses two movies first wins the task and wins one immunity.

 Gang Nikhil won the task.
Shruti got immunity.

 Gang Nikhil was full immune so no one was voted out.

Gangs vs Gangs (Bhalukpong journey) (episodes- 19 to 22) 

 11th Task: Macho survival of the toughest

For this task, one boy and one girl from each gang will perform the task.

 The pair coming first will get immunity as well as one advantage.
 The pair coming second will get one advantage.
 The pair coming third will get an envelope. If the gang uses it correctly, it will be an advantage. If it doesn't, it will be a disadvantage.

The task has 3 stages:

Stage 1: (1) The girl has to free herself from a bamboo cage. (2) The boy has to break the log of wood in which a chain is attached, which locks one of his leg, thus freeing himself.

Stage 2: The pair has to climb a net wall and reach to the other side by monkey crawling.
The first 3 pairs to complete stage 2 only move on to the last stage.

Stage 3: The pair has to row a boat across the river and wave their flag.

 Gang Prince won the task and got immunity as well as one advantage.
 Gang Nikhil won an advantage.
 Gang Raftaar would get an envelope.
 Kashish and Preeti got immunity.
 Minnie was sent directly into the vote out for physically pushing Kriti out of anger as physical violence is against the rule.
 12th Task: Renault Duster Tangle of the road

For this task, one girl and one boy from each gang had to perform along with their gang leader.

Two gangs had to form an alliance, but which has never been formed before.

 Gang Prince and Gang Neha formed one alliance while Gang Nikhil and Gang Raftaar formed the other.

1. One teammate has to drive the car off road.
2. The second teammate has to navigate the driver.
3. The third teammates of each alliance have to balance a rope between them and pick up 5 pots in the way with the help of a hook on the rope.

At the end, both alliances have to throw the pots in a fire pit and break them. On breaking one pot, the other alliance gets 30 seconds added in their time.

 Prince-Neha broke 3 pots. 1 minute 30 seconds got added to the other alliance.
 Nikhil-Raftaar broke 4 pots. 2 minutes got added to the other alliance.

The alliance completing the task in less time will win 2 immunities.

 Alliance Prince-Neha won the task.
 Surbhi and Kriti got immunity.

Raftaar had a power to cast a vote

 13th Task: Durex India Murghabazi

In this task one girl and one boy from each gang had to go against each other. Rohan and Shubdha from Gang Nikhil, Nishkarsh and Iram from Gang Neha, Kashish and Preeti from Prince's Gang and Sonu and Geetika from Raftaar's Gang. The Gangleaders had 100 fruits and they had to bet before every fight.

The winners (1 girl and 1 boy) will get immunity along with all the other members of their gang who are not performin,  the t, ask.

Round 1:

Nishkarsh,Vidit Vs Rohan, Shruti

Won: Nishkarsh, Vidit
Preeti, Kriti Vs Geetika, Surbhi

Won: Preeti, Kriti
Kashish, Minnie Vs Sonu, Mehakdeep

Won: Sonu, Mehakdeep
Shubdha Vs Iram:

Won: Iram

Round 2:
Sonu, Mehakdeep Vs Nishkarsh, Vidit

Won: Nishkarsh, Vidit

Preeti Vs Iram:

Won: Preeti, Surbhi

 The Auction

 The roadie was sold to that gang leader.
 The gang leader's bid was not enough to buy that roadie for the gang.
 The roadie was not only sold to that gang leader but also were immune from the vote-out as a result of being one of the top bidders.

Notes

 - Raftaar sat out for the rest of the bidding  session as he had no fruits left to bid. 
 - Nikav was initially immune from the auction but was replaced by Nishkarsh as soon as the latter is bought by Prince. As a result, Nikav came under auction and bought by Neha. His bidding figure was not revealved to the audience.

Roadies Auction  
Gangs after auction is mentioned in Gangs part below

 Won the bid
 Lost the bid
 Full Gang
 0 Tamuls

 Preeti, Nikav and Sonu got immunity.
In the Inter-Alliance Vote-out Iram Khan and Kriti Verma got voted out.

Gangs vs Gangs (Itanagar Journey) (Episodes- 23 to 25) 

 14th Task: Tag Buddy

For this task two gangs will compete against each other.

The two winning gangs will immunity.

There will be five rounds. In each round, there will be one raider and two defenders. The raider has to tag the defender's face with their gang colour.

# Nikhil vs Raftaar

Gang Raftaar won the match.

# Prince vs Neha

Gang Prince won the match.

Sonu, Geetika, Shubhada, Abhishek, Sharan, Nishkarsh and Preeti won immunity.

 15th Task: Oppo F7 Rescue Plan

For this task, Gang Nikhil and Gang Neha had to compete against each other for one immunity.

 Shruti and Surbhi from the respective gangs were half buried in sand booths, with their hands tied with a rope.

Two boys from each gang had to rescue their girl.

 One boy had to swim in the lake and fetch:

(1) A nail filer: To cut the rope, hence freeing their hands.

(2) An axe: To break open the booth.

(3) The key to the lock on the ankle of their girl.

 The booth had another lock which was to be opened by the QR code on the oppo phone, unlocked by the girl via face recognition.
 The first girl to come out of the booth and ring the bell wins one immunity for the gang.

Gang Nikhil won the task and won one immunity. Rohan got the immunity.

 16th Task: Tick Tock Boom

For this task, two gang members and the gang leader has to perform the task.

1) The first roadie has to crash through a pile of boxes and make his way forward by crossing the path, hanging on the hooks from the ceiling.

2) After crossing the obstacles, the first member has to pull down a bar, acting as a counter weight by which the second member gets pulled up to a certain height.

3) The second member has to see through a binoculars and guide the third member in cutting four coloured wires in the given order, thus diffusing a time bomb.

 The gang which diffuses the bomb in the least amount of time will win complete immunity.

Gang Raftaar won the task and won immunity. Sonu, Abhishek, Vidit and Shubhada got immunity.

In the Vote-out Mehakdeep Singh Randhawa was voted-out.

 17th Task: Renault Duster- Warrior Buster

For this task, the roadies had to challenge previous seasons champions and finalists.

1) The roadie and the challenger will each be balancing on a cart tied to a car and have a joystick in their hands.

2) If the roadie could make the challenger fall off the cart with the joystick in one of the three rounds, he/she would win the challenge and get immunity.

Kashish won the task and got immunity.(Karan Kundra) Special Immunity.Karan Kundra interacted with all the roadies. He had a power to take away an immunity and give it to someone else.

He took Vidit's immunity and gave it to Shruti.Shruti got immunity.In the surprise Vote-out Vidit Sharma and Nikav Bharucha were voted out. Final Destination (Ziro Journey) (Episodes- 26 and 27) 

 18th Task: Renault Duster Ringer Swinger.For this task, two gangs had to form an alliance. The winning alliance would get 4 immunities.

1) One member would be swinging on a plank controlled by 4 members and directed by the 5th member.

2) The swinging member had to pick up 10 flags one by one from post A and place them at post B.

3) While the alliance performed, the other alliance would drive a car across a path and keep ringing the bells in the path.

4) After every 3 bells, one member of the performing alliance had to discontinue from the task.

Neha-Raftaar alliance won the task.Sonu, Abhishek, Kashish and Surbhi won immunity. 19th Task: Ball Ball Bachke.For this task the unimmune roadies had to perform individually. The boys and the girls competed separately.

The goal was to protect your own ball and at the same time get your opponent's ball out of the ring.

Preeti won in girls and Nishkarsh won in boys.Preeti and Nishkarsh got immunity.In the Vote-out Shubhada Nishthala and Bibek Nasangi were voted out. 20th Task: Semi Finale Task - Round 1.For this task :-
•Shruti and Sonu are one team.
•Abhisek Sharan and Surbhi second team.
•Kashish Preeti and Niskarsh third team.Kashish, Preeti, Niskarsh, Abhisek, Sharan and Surbhi are in for Round 2 of semi finaleAfter losing in Semi Finale Task-1 Sonu Jatt and Shruti Sinha were eliminated. Vote Out Order 

Voting History

 Raftaar Gang
 Prince Gang
 Neha Gang
 Nikhil Gang

The numbers 1, 2, 3 and 4 in the chart represent the gangs in which the roadies were originally in before the auction (i.e, 1 - Raftaar, 2 - Prince, 3 - Neha & 4 - Nikhil).

 Indicates the contestant was immune that week.
 Indicates the contestant was in the danger that week.
 Indicates the contestant was eliminated that week.
 The contestant quit the competition
 Indicates the contestant wild card entry in the competition.
 Indicates the contestant won the task and was saved from elimination.
 Indicates the contestant was eliminated outside vote out that week.
 Indicates the contestant is the runner up.
 Indicates the contestant won the competition.[#] Ep12 Special Vote out'''

1. The gang leaders had to write the name of the roadie in the danger zone whom they wanted to eliminate.

2. The roadies had to write the name of the roadie whom they wanted to eliminate, along with the name of the gang leader whom they think must have written that name.

3. If their vote matched with the gang leader whose name has been written, only then the vote will be counted.

References

MTV Roadies
2018 Indian television seasons